Rhabdocarpais is a genus of mites in the family Parasitidae.

Species
 Rhabdocarpais bicuspidatus Athias-Henriot, 1981     
 Rhabdocarpais consanguineus (Oudemans & Voigts, 1904)     
 Rhabdocarpais cunicularis (Womersley, 1956)     
 Rhabdocarpais mammilatus (Berlese, 1904)     
 Rhabdocarpais mycophilus (Karg, 1965)     
 Rhabdocarpais oxymastax Athias-Henriot, 1981     
 Rhabdocarpais parvus Athias-Henriot, 1981     
 Rhabdocarpais spinatus Athias-Henriot, 1981

References

Parasitidae